Hadrolecocatantops uvinza is a species of grasshopper in the family Acrididae. The species is endemic to Tanzania.

References

Acrididae
Endemic fauna of Tanzania
Insects of Tanzania
Insects described in 1994